Firly Apriansyah (born 27 April 1986 in Jakarta, Indonesia) is an Indonesian professional footballer who plays as a centre-back for Liga 3 club Serpong City.

Honours

Club
Bhayangkara
 Liga 1: 2017

References

External links
 Firly Apriansyah at Soccerway
 Firly Apriansyah at Liga Indonesia

1986 births
Living people
Indonesian footballers
Liga 1 (Indonesia) players
Pelita Jaya FC players
Persiwa Wamena players
Persebaya Surabaya players
Borneo F.C. players
Sportspeople from Jakarta
Association football defenders
21st-century Indonesian people